Brian Roberson is a former record-setting receiver for Fresno State University and the XFL's San Francisco Demons.

Sylmar High
Roberson was a standout receiver/defensive back for the Spartans during the 1990-91 seasons. As a Junior in 1990, Roberson caught 16 passes for 222 yards and 2 touchdowns, while also returning an interception for a touchdown. Roberson was named 1st team All-Valley Pac-8 conference as a junior.

As a senior in 1991, Roberson recorded 28 receptions for 464 yards and 5 touchdowns. His total of 15 touchdowns included a record-setting performance against Van Nuys, as he scored touchdowns four different ways: 29-yard reception, 30-yard run, 82-yard punt return, and a 98-yard interception return.

Roberson was named All-City 1st team, Valley Pac-8 conference 1st team, and was selected to play in the Daily News and 1st Annual Glendale vs. Burbank All-Star game. Roberson took official recruiting visits to Colorado State, Washington State, and Fresno State.

Fresno State Bulldogs

As a redshirt freshman in 1993, Roberson caught 5 passes for 50 yards, including a touchdown reception from Trent Dilfer. 1994 set the stage for what would turn out to be one of the most prolific receiving careers in Fresno State history. As a sophomore Roberson began to attract significant attention, catching 50 passes for 900 yards and 4 touchdowns, while earning All-WAC 2nd team honors. As a junior in 1995, Roberson was selected to the WAC 1st team, as he caught 55 balls for 758 yards and 5 touchdowns.

In 1996 Roberson elevated his game to another level with the departure of Charlie Jones to the NFL. A Pre-season All-American, he caught a Fresno State record 78 passes for 1,248 yards and 5 touchdowns.

New York Giants (NFL) (1997)

Roberson signed a free-agent contract with the New York Giants in April 1997. An injury cut short his attempt to become the team's primary punt returner.

Fargo Freeze (IFL) (2000)

Playing for the Fargo Freeze in North Dakota, Roberson was the team's leading receiver in 2000.

San Francisco Demons (XFL) (2001)

Roberson helped guide San Francisco to the title game, catching 36 passes for 395 yards and 2 touchdowns. In his XFL debut he caught an XFL record 12 passes for 127 yards.

Saskatchewan Roughriders (CFL) (2002)

After the XFL folded, Roberson joined the Saskatchewan Roughriders, hauling in 11 balls for 163 yards and a touchdown.

References

Living people
American football wide receivers
Fresno State Bulldogs football players
Saskatchewan Roughriders players
San Francisco Demons players
Canadian football wide receivers
Year of birth missing (living people)
New York Giants players